Marcelo Henrique Teixeira Dias, popularly known as Marcelo Álvaro Antônio (born 16 February 1974), is a Brazilian entrepreneur and politician, and current Minister of Tourism of Brazil.

He was the most voted Federal Deputy in Minas Gerais in the 2018 elections, when he was re-elect with 230,008 votes. Joined the politics in 2012, as City Councillor of Belo Horizonte and member of the Progressive Republican Party (PRP). He is son of former Deputy Álvaro Antônio Teixeira Dias and Vilma Penido Dias. Married with Janaína Cardoso, they had three children: Amanda, Ana Clara and Paulo Henrique. He has Barreiro as main electoral region, where his father had much support during his political career.

Marcelo is currently member of the Social Liberal Party (PSL), being the Chairman of the party in Minas Gerais.

Parliamentary career
Elect with 8,846 votes for City Councillor of Belo Horizonte in 2012, he was the 9th candidate most voted in the city. Presented bills to enlarge the popular participation in the decisions of the Municipal Chamber of Belo Horizonte. Created the bill Councillor of the Neighbourhood, to attend locally the citizens and promote the participation of the citizen in the municipal politics. He was candidate for Federal Deputy in 2014 and was elect with 60,384 votes, the 3rd most voted in Belo Horizonte. In 2016, he was candidate for Mayor of Belo Horizonte, representing the Party of the Republic (PR). In 2018, he was re-elect for the Chamber of Deputies, as member of the Social Liberal Party (PSL), with 230,008 votes, the most voted of Minas Gerais.

Positioning in votings

Controversies

Accusation of embezzlement
On 4 February 2019, Folha de S. Paulo reported the suspect of a scheme of fake candidacies, directing the money from public funds to companies linked to his Chamber cabinet. As Chairman of the party in Minas Gerais, he was responsible to direct R$279,000 (US$ ) to the candidates, which was the minimum value imposed by the Electoral Justice destinated to women candidate to political offices. From the R$279,000 sent to the candidates, at least R$85,000 (US$ ) were sent to bank accounts of four companies belonging to assistants, family members or associates of assistant of Marcelo Álvaro.

Layman candidacies
The Electoral Public Prosecutor's Office of Minas Gerais denounced, on 4 October 2019, the Minister of Tourism Marcelo Álvaro Antônio for three crimes involving lawman candidacies of the party in 2018. Ten other people were denounced. The crimes are: ideological falsehood, electoral misappropriation and criminal association.

The Minister's indictment made by the Federal Police occurred on 3 October 2019 for the electoral crime of omission in accountability and criminal association. The investigations were made as a joint force between the Police and the Public Prosecutor's Office.

Attempt of censorship
In February 2019, judge Grace Correa Pereira Maia, of the 9th Civil Circuit of Brasília, rejected a request made by Marcelo Álvaro to convict the notices of Folha de S. Paulo which linked him to the strawperson scheme. According to the judge, there were no evidences that the reports contained fake informations.

The Brazilian Association of Investigative Journalism (Abraji) published a note:

References

External links
 
 Marcelo Álvaro Antônio on Facebook
 Marcelo Álvaro Antônio on Instagram
 Marcelo Álvaro Antônio on Twitter
 Profile in the Chamber of Deputies

1974 births
Living people
People from Belo Horizonte
Social Liberal Party (Brazil) politicians
Members of the Chamber of Deputies (Brazil) from Minas Gerais
Conservatism in Brazil
Ministers of Tourism of Brazil